Novia Indriani Mamuaja (born November 9, 1994) is an Indonesian beauty pageant titleholder. She was crowned 3rd Runner-up at Puteri Indonesia 2013 and represented her country at Miss Grand International 2013.

Life
Novia Mamuaja was born in Manado, North Sulawesi, and studied at SMA Katolik Rex Mundi Manado. She joined the national flag-hoisting team (Paskibraka) 2011. Mamuaja had success in local pageants: she was crowned Miss SMP Don Bosco Manado 2009, Putri SMA Rex Mundi Manado 2010, Nona Manado 2012 and Nona Fotogenic 2012. She was 1st Runner-up at Noni Manado 2012.

References

External links
 Official Puteri Indonesia website 

Living people
1994 births
Indonesian Christians
Indonesian beauty pageant winners
Puteri Indonesia winners
Indonesian female models